Girsini is a valley of Kohlu District and declared sub tehsil on 2012. The main tribes are Qesrani, Zhing, Thingyani, Shaheja, Mazarani. Notable persons are Mir Sherbaz Khan, Dr. GulBaz Khan, RabNawaz. Notable places are FC qila wilayat, Maqam e Waqar, Bala Dhaka, Pati Shaheja, tokh

Kohlu District